The 2013–14 Pepperdine Waves women's basketball team represented Pepperdine University in the 2013–14 college basketball season. The Waves, members of the West Coast Conference, were led by new head coach Ryan Weisenberg. The Waves played their home games at the Firestone Fieldhouse on the university campus in Malibu, California. They would finish the season 6–25 and in tenth place in the WCC, but they did advance to the WCC Quarterfinals after pulling a 1st Round upset.

Roster

Schedule

|-
!colspan=9 style="background:#FF6200; color:#0021A5;"| Exhibition

|-
!colspan=9 style="background:#0021A5; color:#FF6200;"| Non-conference Regular Season

|-
!colspan=9 style="background:#0021A5; color:#FF6200;"| WCC Regular Season

|-
!colspan=9 style="background:#FF6200; color:#0021A5;"| 2014 West Coast Conference women's basketball tournament

Game Summaries

Exhibition: Westmont
Broadcaster: Josh Perigo

Seattle
Series History: Pepperdine leads 1-0

UCLA
Series History: UCLA leads series 15-3

UC Irvine
Series History: Pepperdine leads 20-11
Broadcaster: Josh Perigo

South Dakota State
Series History: First Meeting

Wyoming
Series History: Wyoming leads 5-3

Oregon
Series History: Oregon leads 2-1

Long Beach State
Series History: Long Beach State leads 10-3

UC Santa Barbara
Series History: Pepperdine leads 16-13
Broadcaster: Josh Perigo

UC Riverside
Series History: Pepperdine leads 11-3

Cal Poly
Series History: Pepperdine leads 12-4
Broadcaster: Josh Perigo

Northern Arizona
Series History: Pepperdine leads 5-3
Broadcaster: Josh Perigo

San Diego
Series History: Pepperdine leads 39-27
Broadcaster: Paula Hood

BYU
Series History: BYU leads 5-2
Broadcasters: Spencer Linton, Kristen Kozlowski, and Andy Boyce

Santa Clara
Series History: Pepperdine leads 33-32
Broadcaster: Josh Perigo

San Francisco
Series History: Pepperdine leads 34-33
Broadcaster: Josh Perigo

Loyola Marymount
Series History: Pepperdine leads 50-18
Broadcaster: Josh Perigo

Saint Mary's
Series History: Saint Mary's leads 31-29

Pacific
Series History: Pepperdine leads 3-0
Broadcasters: Don Gubbins and Alex Sanchez

Portland
Series History: Pepperdine leads series 34-22 
Broadcaster: Josh Perigo

Gonzaga
Series History: Gonzaga leads 30-29
Broadcaster: Josh Perigo

Loyola Marymount
Series History: Pepperdine leads 50-19

Gonzaga
Series History: Gonzaga leads 31-29

Portland
Series History: Pepperdine leads series 34-23

Pacific
Series History: Pepperdine leads 3-1
Broadcasters: Josh Perigo

Saint Mary's
Series History: Saint Mary's leads 32-29
Broadcaster: Josh Perigo

BYU
Series History: BYU leads 6-2
Broadcaster: Josh Perigo

San Diego
Series History: Pepperdine leads 39-28
Broadcaster: Josh Perigo

San Francisco
Series History: Series even 34-34

Rankings

References

Pepperdine
Pepperdine Waves women's basketball seasons
Pepperdine
Pepperdine